Artur Sandauer (14 December 1913, Sambir – 15 July 1989, Warsaw) was a Polish and Jewish literary critic, essayist and professor at the University of Warsaw.

He coined the term allosemitism in a book published in 1982. Sandauer was married to Polish-Jewish painter Erna Rosenstein.

References

Artur Sandauer, On the Situation of the Polish Writer of Jewish Descent in the Twentieth Century: It Is Not I Who Should Have Written This Study...Trans. Abe Shenitzer, Ed. Scott Ury (Jerusalem: Hebrew University Magnes Press, 2005)

1913 births
1989 deaths
Jewish Polish writers
Polish theatre critics
Polish essayists
Male essayists
Polish translators
Academic staff of the University of Warsaw
Jews from Galicia (Eastern Europe)
People from Sambir
Recipients of the Order of Polonia Restituta
Burials at Powązki Military Cemetery
20th-century translators
Polish male non-fiction writers